Zbraslavice is a municipality and village in Kutná Hora District in the Central Bohemian Region of the Czech Republic. It has about 1,400 inhabitants.

Administrative parts
Villages of Borová, Chotěměřice t. Pančava, Hodkov, Kateřinky, Krasoňovice, Lipina, Malá Skalice, Ostrov, Radvančice, Rápošov, Útěšenovice and Velká Skalice are administrative parts of Zbraslavice.

Geography
It lies in the Upper Sázava Hills. The Hodkovský Brook springs here, flows across the municipal territory and supplies several ponds in the area.

History
The first written mention of Zbraslavice is from 1260. It used to be a market town. In 1496, Zbraslavice was almost completely destroyed by a fire, only the local fortress survived. It had to be rebuilt, and the fortress was extended into a small castle.

Sights
The most important monument is the Church of Saint Lawrence. It was originally a Romanesque church from the late 12th century. Around the 14th century, Gothic modifications took place and the tower was added. Late Baroque modifications were made in the 18th century, but the church preserved its authentic Romanesque-Gothic look.

Zbraslavice Castle is a Renaissance castle from the 16th century, built on the site of the former fortress. Baroque modifications took place in the 18th century.

Gallery

References

External links

Villages in Kutná Hora District